Tapiroidea is a superfamily of perissodactyls which includes the modern tapir. Members of the superfamily are small to large browsing mammals, roughly pig-like in shape, with short, prehensile snouts. Their closest relatives are the other odd-toed ungulates, including horses and rhinoceroses. Taxonomically, they are placed in suborder Ceratomorpha along with the rhino superfamily, Rhinocerotoidea. The first members of Tapiroidea appeared during the Early Eocene, 55 million years ago.

Evolution and natural history
 
The first tapirids, such as Heptodon, appeared in the early Eocene. They appeared very similar to modern forms, but were about half the size, and lack the proboscis. The first true tapirs, appeared in the Oligocene, and by the Miocene, such genera as Miotapirus were almost indistinguishable to the extant species. It is believed that Asian and American tapirs diverged around 20 to 30 million years ago, and that tapirs migrated from North America and Central America into South America around 3 million years ago, as part of the Great American Interchange. For much of their history, tapirs were spread across the northern hemisphere, where they became extinct as recently as 10,000 years ago.

It is also believed by some scientists that the tapir may have evolved from Hyracotherium (a palaeothere).

Taxonomy
Superfamily Tapiroidea
Family †Deperetellidae
Genus †Bahinolophus
Genus †Deperetella
Genus †Irenolophus
Genus †Teleolophus
Family Tapiridae
Genus †Eotapirus
Genus †Miotapirus
Genus †Nexuotapirus
Genus †Paratapirus
Genus †Plesiotapirus
Genus †Protapirus (syn. Tanyops)
Genus †Tapiravus
Genus Tapirus
Family †Helaletidae
Genus †Colodon
Genus †Dilophodon
Genus †Helaletes
Genus †Heptodon
Genus †Heteraletes
Genus †Paracolodon 
Genus †Plesiocolopirus
Placement uncertain
Genus †Indolophus
Genus †Thuliadanta

References

Odd-toed ungulates
Tapirs
Extant Eocene first appearances
Mammal superfamilies